Frank "The Animal" Lobman (18 November 1953 – 10 June 2021) was a Surinamese-Dutch kickboxer. He was five times the European kickboxing champion and had an astonishing 90% knockout ratio.  He beat many notable fighters over his career, such as Bas Rutten, Ken Shamrock, and British heavyweight kickboxing champion Steve Taberner. He fought in organizations such as Pancrase, P.K.A., W.K.A., and K-1.

Biography
Lobman was a prominent kickboxer in the 1980s to the early 1990s. He trained often in Crooswijk, Rotterdam where his brother Hedwig Lobman taught Kyokushin karate. Several kickboxing matches were given in the early 1980s with Lucien Carbin. In 1991 he beat Bas Rutten for a European kickboxing title. Lobman was undefeated until his first fight with Peter Aerts. 

He announced his retirement fight in 2002 at the age of 49. His last fight was a 20-year rematch with Jan Oosterbaan in Ahoy-2H2H, but he lost the fight due to a decision.

Titles 
 5 time European Kick Boxing champion
 I.K.B.F. European Heavyweight champion
 E.M.T.A. European Heavyweight champion
 Dutch Heavyweight champion

Kickboxing record 

|-  style="background:#fbb;"
| 2003-03-16 || Loss ||align=left| Jan Oosterbaan || 2 Hot 2 Handle || Rotterdam, Netherlands || TKO || 4  ||  || 
|-  style="background:#cfc;"
| 1994-11-12 || Win ||align=left| Andre Mannaart || Night of the Superstars || Amsterdam, Netherlands || KO || 4 ||  || 
|-  style="background:#fbb;"
| 1994-09-20 || Loss ||align=left| Peter Aerts || The Night of the Stars Tournament, final || Rotterdam, Netherlands || TKO (corner stoppage) || 2 || 2:21 || 
|-  style="background:#cfc;"
| 1994-09-20 || Win ||align=left| Peter Verschuren || The Night of the Stars Tournament, semi final || Rotterdam, Netherlands || Decision || 3 || 3:00 || 
|-  style="background:#cfc;"
| 1994-09-20 || Win ||align=left| Dennis Krauweel || The Night of the Stars Tournament, quarter final || Rotterdam, Netherlands || TKO (leg injury) || 1 ||  || 
|-  style="background:#fbb;"
| 1994-07-30 || Loss ||align=left| Maurice Smith || AJKF Destiny VII || Nagoya, Japan || KO (Left high kick) || 3 || ||
|-  style="background:#cfc;"
| 1994-05-31 || Win ||align=left| Ken Shamrock || Pancrase: Road to the Championship 1 || Tokyo, Japan || TKO (leg kicks) || 2 ||  || 
|-  style="background:#cfc;"
|  1994-05-15 || Win ||align=left| William van Roosmalen || Fight of the Heavy Tanks || Amsterdam, Netherlands || KO (uppercut) || 4 ||  || 
|-  style="background:#fbb;"
| 1994-02-20 || Loss ||align=left| Luc Verheye || The Night Of The Thriller 1994 || Amsterdam, Netherlands || TKO (Towell) || 5 || 0:55 || 
|-  style="background:#cfc;"
| 1993-11-27 || Win ||align=left| Rikioh ||EVOLUTION step8   || Tokyo, Japan || KO || 2 ||  || 
|-  style="background:#cfc;"
| 1993-06-06 || Win ||align=left| Rene Rooze || The War || Rotterdam, Netherlands || KO || 3 ||  || 
|-  style="background:#cfc;"
| 1993-00-00 || Win ||align=left| Mark Russell || The Best of the Best || Eindhoven, Netherlands || KO || 5 ||  || 
|-  style="background:#fbb;"
| 1992-09-20 || Loss ||align=left| Peter Aerts || The Night of The Truth || Rotterdam, Netherlands || TKO (referee stoppage) || 3 || 1:31 || 
|-  style="background:#fbb;"
| 1991-11-18 || Loss ||align=left| Peter Aerts || Night of Fights || Rotterdam, Netherlands || Decision (Unanimous) || 5 || 3:00 || 
|-  style="background:#cfc;"
| 1991-02-12 || Win ||align=left| Bas Rutten ||  || Rotterdam, Netherlands || KO || 1 ||  || 
|-  style="background:#cfc;"
| 199X-00-00 || Win ||align=left| Jean Atonga ||  || Rotterdam, Netherlands || KO ||  ||  || 
|-  style="background:#cfc;"
| 1984-00-00 || Win ||align=left| Jan Oosterbaan ||  || Rotterdam, Netherlands || Decision ||  ||  ||
|-  style="background:#cfc;"
| 1981-11-29 || Win ||align=left| Steve Taberner ||  || Netherlands || Decision ||  ||  || 
|-
| colspan=9 | Legend:

References

External links 
mixed martial arts record 
kickboxing achievements 
 pancrase profile 
 Aerts on Lobman 

1953 births
2021 deaths
Dutch male kickboxers
Surinamese male kickboxers
Heavyweight kickboxers
Dutch Muay Thai practitioners
Surinamese Muay Thai practitioners
Surinamese emigrants to the Netherlands
Sportspeople from Rotterdam
Sportspeople from Paramaribo